Louis J. Harper was the second head football coach at Kentucky State University in Frankfort, Kentucky and he held that position for two seasons, from 1924 until 1925.  His career coaching record at Kentucky State was 1–5.

References

Year of birth missing
Year of death missing
Kentucky State Thorobreds football coaches